Qualification was done at the 2011 Pan American Games Qualification Tournament in Lima, Peru between March 25 and 26, 2011. The tournament was a knockout tournament, in which the final placements were not determined. There is also a further eight spots available as wildcards.

Qualification summary
The following countries qualified athletes:

Qualification category

-58kg Men

-68kg Men

-80kg Men

-80+kg Men

-49kg Women

-57kg Women

-67kg Women

67+kg Women

Due to the nature of the tournament, in which the final placements are not determined, the nations are listed in alphabetical order.

References 

P
Qualification for the 2011 Pan American Games
Taekwondo at the 2011 Pan American Games